Raúl Fernando Poclaba (born 23 January 1990) is an Argentine professional footballer who plays as a defender, most recently for Portuguesa.

Career

Club
Poclaba started his professional career in 2011 with Racing, he made his debut for the club in the Argentine Primera División on 13 February against All Boys. After two further appearances in his debut season, 2010–11, Poclaba was loaned out later in the year to Uruguayan Primera División side Nacional. He made just 1 appearance for Nacional. Upon returning to Racing, he failed to make an appearance in two seasons for the club and left in 2013 to join Primera B Nacional club Gimnasia y Esgrima. After three successful seasons with Gimnasia, which included 77 appearances and 1 goal, he departed three years after joining as he completed a move to Argentine Primera División club Aldosivi. He made his Aldosivi debut versus Tigre on 21 May 2016. On 28 February 2017, Poclaba joined Primera B Nacional side Douglas Haig.

On 13 September 2017, Poclaba signed for Gimnasia y Tiro.

Career statistics

Club
.

References

External links
 

1990 births
Living people
Sportspeople from Jujuy Province
Argentine footballers
Association football defenders
Argentine expatriate footballers
Argentine people of indigenous peoples descent
Racing Club de Avellaneda footballers
Club Nacional de Football players
Gimnasia y Esgrima de Jujuy footballers
Aldosivi footballers
Club Atlético Douglas Haig players
Argentine Primera División players
Uruguayan Primera División players
Primera Nacional players
Expatriate footballers in Uruguay